The Three Brothers is a group of steep white islets in the Sea of Okhotsk, about 650 m off the Eastern Cape, just outside Veselaya Bay, about 13 km from the town of Magadan in the Kamchatka peninsula, Russia.  It is a local tourist landmark and a favorite target for photographers.

See also 
 Three Brothers, islands at Cape Sagan Khushun, near Olkhon, Lake Baikal, Russia
 Three Brothers or Tri Brata a group of three upright rocks in Avacha Bay, Kamchatka

External links 
 The Three Brothers on Panoramio
 The Three Brothers and the Cape on Panoramio
 The Three Brothers at Club.Foto.ru

Islands of the Sea of Okhotsk